In computational complexity theory, NP-hardness (non-deterministic polynomial-time hardness) is the defining property of a class of problems that are informally "at least as hard as the hardest problems in NP". A simple example of an NP-hard problem is the subset sum problem.

A more precise specification is: a problem H is NP-hard when every problem L in NP can be reduced in polynomial time to H; that is, assuming a solution for H takes 1 unit time, Hs solution can be used to solve L in polynomial time. As a consequence, finding a polynomial time algorithm to solve any NP-hard problem would give polynomial time algorithms for all the problems in NP. As it is suspected that P≠NP, it is unlikely that such an algorithm exists.

It is suspected that there are no polynomial-time algorithms for NP-hard problems, but that has not been proven. Moreover, the class P, in which all problems can be solved in polynomial time, is contained in the NP class.

Definition 
A decision problem H is NP-hard when for every problem L in NP, there is a polynomial-time many-one reduction from L to H.
An equivalent definition is to require that every problem L in NP can be solved in polynomial time by an oracle machine with an oracle for H. Informally, an algorithm can be thought of that calls such an oracle machine as a subroutine for solving H and solves L in polynomial time if the subroutine call takes only one step to compute.

Another definition is to require that there be a polynomial-time reduction from an NP-complete problem G to H. As any problem L in NP reduces in polynomial time to G, L reduces in turn to H in polynomial time so this new definition implies the previous one. Awkwardly, it does not restrict the class NP-hard to decision problems, and it also includes search problems or optimization problems.

Consequences 
If P ≠ NP, then NP-hard problems could not be solved in polynomial time.

Some NP-hard optimization problems can be polynomial-time approximated up to some constant approximation ratio (in particular, those in APX) or even up to any approximation ratio (those in PTAS or FPTAS).

Examples 
All NP-complete problems are also NP-hard (see List of NP-complete problems). For example, the optimization problem of finding the least-cost cyclic route through all nodes of a weighted graph—commonly known as the travelling salesman problem—is NP-hard. The subset sum problem is another example: given a set of integers, does any non-empty subset of them add up to zero? That is a decision problem and happens to be NP-complete.

There are decision problems that are NP-hard but not NP-complete such as the halting problem. That is the problem which asks "given a program and its input, will it run forever?" That is a yes/no question and so is a decision problem. It is easy to prove that the halting problem is NP-hard but not NP-complete. For example, the Boolean satisfiability problem can be reduced to the halting problem by transforming it to the description of a Turing machine that tries all truth value assignments and when it finds one that satisfies the formula it halts and otherwise it goes into an infinite loop. It is also easy to see that the halting problem is not in NP since all problems in NP are decidable in a finite number of operations, but the halting problem, in general, is undecidable. There are also NP-hard problems that are neither NP-complete nor Undecidable. For instance, the language of true quantified Boolean formulas is decidable in polynomial space, but not in non-deterministic polynomial time (unless NP = PSPACE).

NP-naming convention 
NP-hard problems do not have to be elements of the complexity class NP.
As NP plays a central role in computational complexity, it is used as the basis of several classes:
NP Class of computational decision problems for which any given yes-solution can be verified as a solution in polynomial time by a deterministic Turing machine (or solvable by a non-deterministic Turing machine in polynomial time).
NP-hard Class of problems which are at least as hard as the hardest problems in NP. Problems that are NP-hard do not have to be elements of NP; indeed, they may not even be decidable.
NP-complete Class of decision problems which contains the hardest problems in NP. Each NP-complete problem has to be in NP.
NP-easy At most as hard as NP, but not necessarily in NP.
NP-equivalent Decision problems that are both NP-hard and NP-easy, but not necessarily in NP.
NP-intermediate If P and NP are different, then there exist decision problems in the region of NP that fall between P and the NP-complete problems. (If P and NP are the same class, then NP-intermediate problems do not exist because in this case every NP-complete problem would fall in P, and by definition, every problem in NP can be reduced to an NP-complete problem.)

Application areas 
NP-hard problems are often tackled with rules-based languages in areas including:
 Approximate computing
 Configuration
 Cryptography
 Data mining
 Decision support
 Phylogenetics
 Planning
 Process monitoring and control
 Rosters or schedules
 Routing/vehicle routing
 Scheduling

References 

 
Complexity classes